Root sheath may refer to any of these biological structures:

Epithelial root sheath, a proliferation of epithelial cells located at the cervical loop of the enamel organ in a developing tooth
Root sheath (hair), at the base of a hair follicle
Inner root sheath
Outer root sheath
Seed root sheath, root sheaths in the seeds of plants